

See also 
 United States House of Representatives elections, 1804 and 1805
 List of United States representatives from Kentucky

Notes

References 

1804
Kentucky
United States House of Representatives